A post hole clam-shell digger, also called post hole pincer or simply post hole digger, is a tool consisting of two articulated shovel-like blades, forming an incomplete hollow cylinder about a foot long and a few inches wide, with two long handles that can put the blades in an "open" (parallel) position or a "closed" (convergent) position.

The tool is used to dig holes in the ground, typically from a few inches to a about a foot in diameter, for general purposes such as setting fence and sign posts or planting saplings.   In operation, the tool is jabbed into the ground with the blades in the open position.  The handles are then operated to close the blades, thus grabbing the portion of soil between them.  The tool is then pulled out and the soil is deposited by the side. The process is repeated until the hole is deep enough.

Comparison with earth augers
An earth auger is another tool that is used to dig holes in the ground, consisting of a rotating shaft with one or more blades attached at the lower end. A hand-powered auger is generally easier to use than a clam-shell digger, and can in principle dig deeper.  It naturally creates a round and straight hole, but only of a fixed diameter. A clam-shell-type digger, in contrast, can be used to dig holes of any shape and any diameter greater than that of the open blades.

History and patent info 
Clam-shell-type pole diggers seem to be a relatively recent invention, newer than earth augers. A patent was filed by J. Lawry of Lenior City, Tennessee in 1908. The patent has the traditional clam-shell design with an extra spike in the center.

References

External links

Gardening tools